The Ryanggang Hotel(량강호텔) was a first class hotel located in the Mangyongdae District of Pyongyang, North Korea. It has 330 rooms. The hotel was built in 1989 on a hill overlooking the Taedong and Pothong rivers, next to Seosan Football Stadium. The hotel covers an area of roughly 33,000 square metres  and has two main buildings. There is a revolving restaurant on the top floor, and it has a library, billiard room, soft drink counter and shop.

See also 

 List of hotels in North Korea
 List of revolving restaurants

References 

Hotels in Pyongyang
Hotels established in 1989
Hotel buildings completed in 1989
Buildings and structures with revolving restaurants
1989 establishments in North Korea
20th-century architecture in North Korea